Classic College International (CCI) is a college situated at the Pingala Marg, Gaushala in Kathmandu, Nepal. It was established in the year 2056 BS (1999 AD) at Thapathali. Later on in year 2062 BS (2005 AD), it was shifted to Gaushala. The regular courses of Science (+2), Management (+2), Humanities (+2), Bachelors in Business Administration (B.B.A), Bachelors in Social Work (B.S.W) and Bachelors in Business Studies (B.B.S) are held regularly in the college.
The current principal of the college is Mani Kumar Poudel (Degree in English, Degree in Human Rights).

Photo gallery

External links 
 Official website of

References

Schools in Kathmandu
1999 establishments in Nepal